Jakob Jensen may refer to:
Bernhard Jensen (full name Jakob Bernhard Christian Jensen, often known as Jakob Jensen), Danish Olympic flatwater canoeist
Jakob Jensen (politician) (1858-1942), Danish politician
Jakob Green Jensen (born 1982), Danish handball player
Jacob Jensen (born 1926), Danish industrial designer
Jakob Precht Jensen

See also
Timothy Jacob Jensen (born 1962), Danish industrial designer